Gleb Borisovich Axelrod (11 October 1923 in Moscow – 2 October 2003 in Hannover; also spelled Gleb Akselrod) was a Russian pianist.

He was a disciple of Grigory Ginzburg. Axelrod won, ex-aequo with Marina Slesaryeva, the II piano edition of the Prague Spring Festival Competition (1951). In 1955, he obtained a 4th prize at the Concours Long-Thibaud, and two years later he placed second at the inaugural Vianna da Motta Competition. He subsequently held a professorship at the Moscow Conservatory.

References
 
 Weapons of mass construction  at Concours Long-Thibaud
  at National University of Colombia

Russian classical pianists
Male classical pianists
Musicians from Moscow
1923 births
2003 deaths
Long-Thibaud-Crespin Competition prize-winners
20th-century classical pianists
20th-century Russian male musicians
Soviet pianists